...ing is a 2003 South Korean film starring Im Soo-jung, Kim Rae-won and Lee Mi-sook and directed by Lee Eon-hee. The title refers to the present continuous tense in English. Part of the movie  were shot in Saipan.

Plot
Min-ah (Im Soo-jung) is a young woman who has become reserved and aloof to the world as a result of her chronic illness and deformed hand. The film quietly portrays the unconventional, yet endearing relationship between Min-ah and her mother Mi-sook (Lee Mi-sook), as well as Min-ah's development as she is befriended by the high-spirited and carefree photographer Young-jae (Kim Rae-won) who moves into their apartment complex.

Cast
 Im Soo-jung as Kang Min-ah 
 Kim Rae-won as Young-jae
 Lee Mi-sook as Mi-sook
 Choi Deok-moon as Gi-soo

Soundtrack

Remake
A 2012 Chinese remake titled First Time (第一次) starred Angelababy, Mark Chao and Jiang Shan.

See also
 Cinema of Korea
 Contemporary culture of South Korea
 List of Korean-language films

References

External links
 
 
 

2003 films
2000s Korean-language films
South Korean romantic drama films
Films shot in Seoul
2003 romantic drama films
Films shot in the Northern Mariana Islands
South Korean films remade in other languages
2000s South Korean films